Potassium iodate (KIO3) is an ionic chemical compound consisting of K+ ions and IO3− ions in a 1:1 ratio.

Preparation and properties
Potassium iodate is an oxidizing agent and as such it can cause fires if in contact with combustible materials or reducing agents.  It can be prepared by reacting a potassium-containing base such as potassium hydroxide with iodic acid, for example:

It can also be prepared by adding iodine to a hot, concentrated solution of potassium hydroxide.

Or by fusing potassium iodide with potassium chlorate, bromate or perchlorate, the melt is extracted with water and potassium iodate is isolated from the solution by crystallization:

Conditions/substances to avoid include: heat, shock, friction, combustible materials, reducing materials, aluminium, organic compounds, carbon, hydrogen peroxide and sulfides.

Applications
Potassium iodate is sometimes used for iodination of table salt to prevent iodine deficiency. Because iodide can be oxidized to iodine by molecular oxygen under wet conditions, US companies add thiosulfates or other antioxidants to the potassium iodide. In other countries, potassium iodate is used as a source for dietary iodine. It is also an ingredient in some baby formula.

Like potassium bromate, potassium iodate is occasionally used as a maturing agent in baking.

Radiation protection

Potassium iodate may be used to protect against accumulation of radioactive iodine in the thyroid by saturating the body with a stable source of iodine prior to exposure. Approved by the World Health Organization for radiation protection, potassium iodate (KIO3) is an alternative to potassium iodide (KI), which has poor shelf life in hot and humid climates.  The UK, Singapore, United Arab Emirates, and the U.S. states Idaho and Utah all maintain potassium iodate tablets towards this end. Following the September 11 attacks, the government of Ireland issued potassium iodate tablets to all households for a similar purpose.

Potassium iodate is not approved by the U.S. Food and Drug Administration (FDA) for use as a thyroid blocker, and the FDA has taken action against US websites that promote this use.

References

Iodates
Potassium compounds
Oxidizing agents